Pavol is a masculine Slovak given name, equivalent to Paul. Notable people with the name include:

Pavol Adami (1739–1795), Slovak scientist and scholar, one of the first veterinarians
Pavol Baláž (born 1984), Slovak footballer
Pavol Biroš (born 1953), former Slovak football player
Pavol Blažek (born 1958), race walker who represented Czechoslovakia and later Slovakia in the Olympic Games
Pavol Demitra (1974–2011), Slovak professional ice hockey player
Pavol Ďurica (born 1983), Slovak footballer
Pavol Farkas (born 1985), Slovak footballer
Pavol Hamžík (born 1954), former Foreign Minister of Slovakia from 1996 to 1997
Pavol Hnilica (1921–2006), Slovak Roman Catholic bishop and Jesuit
Pavol Hochschorner (born 1979), Slovak slalom canoeist
Pavol Hrivnák (1931–1995), Prime minister of Slovakia
Pavol Hrušovský (born 1952), the Speaker of the National Council of the Slovak Republic
Pavol Hudák (born 1959), Slovak poet
Pavol Jablonicky, IFBB professional bodybuilder
Pavol Jozef Šafárik University, university located in Košice, Slovakia
Pavol Jurčo (born 1986), professional Slovak footballer
Pavol Kopp, Slovak sport shooter
Pavol Masaryk (born 1980), Slovak footballer
Pavol Michalík (born 1951), former Slovak football goalkeeper
Pavol Molnár (born 1936), former Slovak football player
Pavol Országh Hviezdoslav (1849–1921), Slovak poet, dramatist, translator and member of  parliament
Pavol Paška, Slovak politician and Speaker of the National Council of the Slovak Republic
Pavol Peter Gojdič (1888–1960), Basilian monk, bishop of the Greek Catholic Eparchy of Prešov, martyred by the communist regime in Czechoslovakia
Pavol Pronaj (born 1982), Slovak professional footballer
Pavol Regenda (born 1999), Slovak professional ice hockey player
Pavol Rusko, the former leader of the Slovak political party Aliancia nového občana
Pavol Schmidt (1930–2001), Slovak rower
Pavol Sedlák (born 1979), Slovak footballer
Pavol Šoral (born 1903), former Slovak football player
Pavol Staňo (born 1977), Slovak footballer
Pavol Steiner (1908–1969), Czechoslovak/Slovak Olympic water polo player and cardiac surgeon
Pavol Straka (born 1980), Slovak football player
Pavol Suhaj (born 1981), Slovak football striker
Pavol Zemanovič (born 1990), Slovak football defender

Slovak masculine given names